Madison Smartt Bell (born August 1, 1957, in Nashville, Tennessee) is an American novelist.  While established as a writer by several early novels, he is especially known for his trilogy of novels about Toussaint Louverture and the Haitian Revolution, published 1995–2004.

Early life and education
Raised in Nashville, Tennessee, Madison Smartt Bell is a graduate of Montgomery Bell Academy.  He is a graduate of Princeton University, where he won the Ward Mathis Prize and the Francis Leymoyne Page award, and Hollins University, where he won the Andrew James Purdy fiction award. He later lived in New York City and London before settling in Baltimore, Maryland.

Career
Bell is a Professor of English at Goucher College in Towson, Maryland, where he was Director of the Creative Writing Program from 1998 to 2004.

Bell has taught in various creative writing programs, including the Iowa Writers' Workshop, the Poetry Center of the 92nd Street Y, and the Johns Hopkins Writing Seminars.

In addition, he has written essays and reviews for Harper's, The New York Review of Books, and the New York Times Book Review.

His papers are held at Princeton University and at East Carolina University. The latter contains papers related to novels and other writing early in his career, up to 1990.

Personal life
Bell is married to the poet Elizabeth Spires, who also teaches at Goucher College. They have a daughter, Celia Dovell Bell.

Awards
 All Souls' Rising, a novel about Toussaint Louverture and the Haitian Revolution, was a finalist for the 1995 National Book Award and the 1996 PEN/Faulkner Award. It won the 1996 Anisfield-Wolf Award for the best book of the year dealing with matters of race. 
 He won a Strauss Living Award from the American Academy of Arts and Letters.

Bibliography

Fiction
The Washington Square Ensemble (novel) (Viking Press, 1983) (Penguin Contemporary American Fiction Series, 1984) 
Waiting For The End Of The World (novel) (Ticknor & Fields, 1985) (Penguin Contemporary American Fiction Series, 1986)
Straight Cut (novel) (Ticknor & Fields, 1986) (Penguin mass-market paperback, 1987) (re-issued by Hard Case Crime in 2006)
Zero db (short fiction) (Ticknor & Fields, 1987) (Penguin Contemporary American Fiction Series, 1988)
The Year Of Silence (novel) (Ticknor & Fields, 1987) (Penguin Contemporary American Fiction Series, 1989)
Soldier's Joy (novel) (Ticknor & Fields, 1989) (Penguin Contemporary American Fiction Series, 1990)
Barking Man (short fiction) (Ticknor & Fields, 1990) (Penguin Contemporary American Fiction Series, 1991) (Quality Paperback Club, 1991)
Doctor Sleep (novel) (Harcourt Brace Jovanovich, 1991) (Penguin Contemporary American Fiction Series, 1992), (adapted for film as Close Your Eyes (2002), now also known as Doctor Sleep)
Save Me, Joe Louis (novel) (Harcourt Brace Jovanovich, 1993) (Penguin Contemporary American Fiction Series, 1994)
All Souls' Rising (novel, 1st part of Haiti Trilogy) (Pantheon, 1995) (Penguin Contemporary American Fiction Series, 1996)
Ten Indians (novel) (Pantheon, 1996) (Penguin Contemporary American Fiction Series, 1997)
Master of the Crossroads (novel, 2nd part of Haiti Trilogy) (Pantheon, 2000)
Anything Goes (Pantheon, 2002)
The Stone That the Builder Refused (novel, 3rd part of Haiti Trilogy) (Pantheon, 2004)
 Charm City (Crown: 2007)
 Devil's Dream (novel about Nathan Bedford Forrest and the American Civil War) (Pantheon, 2009)
 The Color of Night (Vintage, 2011)
 Zig Zag Wanderer (Concord Free Press, 2013)
 Behind the Moon (City Lights Publishers, 2017)

Non-fiction
Narrative Design: A Writer's Guide to Structure (textbook) (W.W. Norton, 1997)
Narrative Design: Working with Imagination, Craft, and Form (trade paperback edition) (Norton, 2000)
Lavoisier in the Year One: The Birth of a New Science in an Age of Revolution (non-fiction) (Norton, released June 13, 2005)

Biography
Freedom's Gate: A Brief Life of Toussaint L'Ouverture (non-fiction) (Pantheon, 2007)
Toussaint Louverture: A Biography (non-fiction) (Vintage, 2008)
Child of Light: A Biography of Robert Stone (non-fiction), (Doubleday, 2020)

References

External links
KEVIN LANAHAN, "Bell's 'Stone' caps acclaimed Haiti trilogy", SUNY Albany, Writers Institute 
Stuart Wright Collection: Madison Smartt Bell Papers, 1922–1990 (#1169-001), East Carolina Manuscript Collection, J. Y. Joyner Library, East Carolina University
Jeremy D. Popkin, "Madison Smartt Bell's Haitian Revolution Trilogy", Fiction and Film for Scholars of France, H-France 
Close Your Eyes, IMDb
 

1957 births
20th-century American biographers
20th-century American essayists
20th-century American male writers
20th-century American novelists
20th-century American short story writers
21st-century American biographers
21st-century American essayists
21st-century American male writers
21st-century American novelists
21st-century American short story writers
American male biographers
American male essayists
American male novelists
American male short story writers
Goucher College faculty and staff
Hollins University alumni
Iowa Writers' Workshop faculty
Living people
Novelists from Iowa
Novelists from Maryland
Novelists from Tennessee
PEN/Faulkner Award for Fiction winners
People from Nashville, Tennessee
Princeton University alumni
Writers from Baltimore